My Dear is the debut album by American rock band New Years Day, released in 2007 by TVT Records. The album was self-financed, self-produced, and recorded over an eight-month period at the home of producer Eugene Pererras. The band's debut music video for the lead single "I Was Right" won an MTVU "Freshman Face" poll and was added to the channel's playlist.

The album includes contributions from John Christianson and Dan Regan of Reel Big Fish, who provide horns on "My Sweet Unvalentine." "Brilliant Lies" includes lyrics written by Justin Pierre of Motion City Soundtrack.

Track listing 
All songs written by Adam Lohrbach, except where noted.
"I Was Right" - 3:01
"Ready Aim Misfire" - 3:21
"My Dear" - 3:48
"Part Time Lover" - 2:53
"Sunrise Sunset" - 2:59
"My Sweet Unvalentine" - 3:24
"You'll Only Make it Worse" - 3:36
"Brilliant Lies" (Guy Erez, Emerson Swinford, Ashley Costello, Justin Pierre, Eugene Pererras) - 3:50
"Temecula Sunrise" - 3:45
"Razor" - 2:51
"Saying Goodbye" - 3:47
"Let's Toast" (iTunes-only bonus track)

Performers 

Ashley Costello - lead vocals
Keith Drover - rhythm guitar, keyboards, backing vocals
Mike Schoolden - lead guitar, backing vocals
Adam Lohrbach - bass guitar, backing vocals
Russell Dixon - drums
Additional Performers:
John Christianson - trumpet on "My Sweet Unvalentine"
Dan Regan - trombone on "My Sweet Unvalentine"
John Urban - upright bass on "My Sweet Unvalentine"
Eugene Perreras, Lindsey Christopher, and April Agostini - backing vocals

Album information 

Record label: TVT Records
Produced by Eugene Pererras, Adam Lohrbach, and New Year's Day
Recorded at Eugenious Studios
Additional recording at Hard Drive Studios in North Hollywood, California
Additional engineering by Doug Messenger, Ryan Baker, Adam Lohrbach, Mike Schoolden, and Russell Dixon
Mixed by Paul David Hagar at Encore Studios in Burbank, California
Mastered by George Marino at Sterling Sound in New York, New York
All songs written by Adam Lohrbach and New Year's Day except "Brilliant Lies" by Guy Erez, Emerson Swinford, Ashley Costello, Justin Pierre, and Eugene Pererras.
Strings and orchestral arrangements by Mike Schoolden
Programming and electronics by Keith Drover and Justin Fowler
A&R - Leonard B. Johnson

References 

2007 debut albums
New Years Day (band) albums